The World Group was the highest level of Fed Cup competition in 2002. Sixteen nations competed in a four-round knockout competition. Belgium was the defending champion, but they were defeated in the quarterfinals by Italy. Slovakia defeated Italy, and then Spain in the final to claim their 1st title and No. 1 ranking.

Participating Teams

Draw

First round

Belgium vs. Australia

Sweden vs. Italy

Slovakia vs. Switzerland

Argentina vs. France

United States vs. Austria

Croatia vs. Czech Republic

Spain vs. Hungary

Germany vs. Russia

Quarterfinals

Belgium vs. Italy

Slovakia vs. France

Austria vs. Croatia

Spain vs. Germany

Semifinals

Italy vs. Slovakia

Austria vs. Spain

Final

Slovakia vs. Spain

References

See also
Fed Cup structure

World Group